The Urban Rowhouse is a historic rowhouse located at 30–38 Pearl Street in Cambridge, Massachusetts.  Built in 1874, this was one of the earliest masonry rowhouses to be built in Cambridge.  Stylistically, the three story brick buildings are in a Ruskinian Gothic style, with horizontal bands of colored brick, hooded window lintels, a corbelled cornice, and a steeply-pitched mansard roof with gabled dormers.

The rowhouse was listed on the National Register of Historic Places in 1982.

See also
Urban Rowhouse (40–48 Pearl Street, Cambridge, Massachusetts)
Urban Rowhouse (26–32 River Street, Cambridge, Massachusetts)
National Register of Historic Places listings in Cambridge, Massachusetts

References

Buildings and structures in Cambridge, Massachusetts
Residential buildings on the National Register of Historic Places in Massachusetts
National Register of Historic Places in Cambridge, Massachusetts